Robert Leroy Johnson (May 8, 1911August 16, 1938) was an American blues musician and songwriter. His landmark recordings in 1936 and 1937 display a combination of singing, guitar skills, and songwriting talent that has influenced later generations of musicians. Although his recording career spanned only seven months, he is now recognized as a master of the blues, particularly the Delta blues style, and one of the most influential musicians of the 20th century. The Rock and Roll Hall of Fame describes him as being "the first ever rock star".

As a traveling performer who played mostly on street corners, in juke joints, and at Saturday night dances, Johnson had little commercial success or public recognition in his lifetime. He participated in only two recording sessions, one in San Antonio in 1936, and one in Dallas in 1937, that produced 29 distinct songs (with 13 surviving alternate takes) recorded by famed Country Music Hall of Fame producer Don Law. These songs, recorded solo in improvised studios, were the totality of his recorded output. Other than these recordings, very little was known of him during his life outside of the small musical circuit in the Mississippi Delta where he spent most of his life; much of his story has been reconstructed after his death by researchers. Johnson's poorly documented life and death have given rise to much legend. The one most closely associated with his life is that he sold his soul to the devil at a local crossroads to achieve musical success.

His music had a small, but influential, following during his life and in the two decades after his death. In late 1938 John Hammond sought him out for a concert at Carnegie Hall, From Spirituals to Swing, only to discover that Johnson had died. Brunswick Records, which owned the original recordings, was bought by Columbia Records, where Hammond was employed. Musicologist Alan Lomax went to Mississippi in 1941 to record Johnson, also not knowing of his death. Law, who by then worked for Columbia Records, assembled a collection of Johnson's recordings titled King of the Delta Blues Singers that was released by Columbia in 1961. It is widely credited with finally bringing Johnson's work to a wider audience. The album would become influential, especially on the nascent British blues movement; Eric Clapton has called Johnson "the most important blues singer that ever lived." Bob Dylan, Keith Richards, and Robert Plant have cited both Johnson's lyrics and musicianship as key influences on their own work. Many of Johnson's songs have been covered over the years, becoming hits for other artists, and his guitar licks and lyrics have been borrowed by many later musicians.

Renewed interest in Johnson's work and life led to a burst of scholarship starting in the 1960s. Much of what is known about him was reconstructed by researchers such as Gayle Dean Wardlow and Bruce Conforth, especially in their 2019 award-winning biography of Johnson: Up Jumped the Devil: The Real Life of Robert Johnson (Chicago Review Press). Two films, the 1991 documentary The Search for Robert Johnson by John Hammond Jr., and a 1997 documentary, Can't You Hear the Wind Howl?: The Life & Music of Robert Johnson, which included reconstructed scenes with Keb' Mo' as Johnson, were attempts to document his life, and demonstrated the difficulties arising from the scant historical record and conflicting oral accounts. Over the years, the significance of Johnson and his music has been recognized by  the Rock and Roll, Grammy, and Blues Halls of Fame; and the National Recording Preservation Board.

Life and career

Early life
Robert Leroy Johnson was born in Hazlehurst, Mississippi, possibly on May 8, 1911, to Julia Major Dodds (born October 1874) and Noah Johnson (born December 1884). Julia was married to Charles Dodds (born February 1865), a relatively prosperous landowner and furniture maker, with whom she had ten children. Charles Dodds had been forced by a lynch mob to leave Hazlehurst following a dispute with white landowners. Julia left Hazlehurst with baby Robert, but in less than two years she brought the boy to Memphis to live with her husband, who had changed his name to Charles Spencer.  Robert spent the next 8–9 years growing up in Memphis and attending the Carnes Avenue Colored School where he received lessons in arithmetic, reading, language, music, geography, and physical exercise.  It was in Memphis that he acquired his love for, and knowledge of, the blues and popular music.  His education and urban context placed him apart from most of his contemporary blues musicians.

Robert rejoined his mother around 1919–1920 after she married an illiterate sharecropper named Will "Dusty" Willis. They originally settled on a plantation in Lucas Township in Crittenden County, Arkansas, but soon moved across the Mississippi River to Commerce in the Mississippi Delta, near Tunica and Robinsonville. They lived on the Abbay & Leatherman Plantation. Julia's new husband was 24 years her junior. Robert was remembered by some residents as "Little Robert Dusty", but he was registered at Tunica's Indian Creek School as Robert Spencer. In the 1920 census, he is listed as Robert Spencer, living in Lucas, Arkansas, with Will and Julia Willis. Robert was at school in 1924 and 1927.  The quality of his signature on his marriage certificate suggests that he was relatively well educated for a man of his background. A school friend, Willie Coffee, who was interviewed and filmed in later life, recalled that as a youth Robert was already noted for playing the harmonica and jaw harp. Coffee recalled that Robert was absent for long periods, which suggests that he may have been living and studying in Memphis.

Once Julia informed Robert about his biological father, Robert adopted the surname Johnson, using it on the certificate of his marriage to sixteen-year-old Virginia Travis in February 1929. She died in childbirth shortly after. Surviving relatives of Virginia told the blues researcher Robert "Mack" McCormick that this was a divine punishment for Robert's decision to sing secular songs, known as "selling your soul to the Devil". McCormick believed that Johnson himself accepted the phrase as a description of his resolve to abandon the settled life of a husband and farmer to become a full-time blues musician.

Around this time, the blues musician Son House moved to Robinsonville, where his musical partner Willie Brown lived. Late in life, House remembered Johnson as a "little boy" who was a competent harmonica player but an embarrassingly bad guitarist. Soon after, Johnson left Robinsonville for the area around Martinsville, close to his birthplace, possibly searching for his natural father. Here he perfected the guitar style of House and learned other styles from Isaiah "Ike" Zimmerman. Zimmerman was rumored to have learned supernaturally to play guitar by visiting graveyards at midnight.
When Johnson next appeared in Robinsonville, he seemed to have miraculously acquired a guitar technique. House was interviewed at a time when the legend of Johnson's pact with the devil was well known among blues researchers. He was asked whether he attributed Johnson's technique to this pact, and his equivocal answers have been taken as confirmation.

While living in Martinsville, Johnson fathered a child with Vergie Mae Smith. He married Caletta Craft in May 1931. In 1932, the couple settled for a while in Clarksdale, Mississippi, in the Delta, but Johnson soon left for a career as a "walking" or itinerant musician, and Caletta died in early 1933.

Itinerant musician
From 1932 until his death in 1938, Johnson moved frequently between the cities of Memphis and Helena, and the smaller towns of the Mississippi Delta and neighboring regions of Mississippi and Arkansas. On occasion, he traveled much further. The blues musician Johnny Shines accompanied him to Chicago, Texas, New York, Canada, Kentucky, and Indiana. Henry Townsend shared a musical engagement with him in St. Louis. In many places he stayed with members of his large extended family or with female friends. He did not marry again but formed some long-term relationships with women to whom he would return periodically. In other places he stayed with whatever woman he was able to seduce at his performance. In each location, Johnson's hosts were largely ignorant of his life elsewhere. He used different names in different places, employing at least eight distinct surnames.

Biographers have looked for consistency from musicians who knew Johnson in different contexts: Shines, who traveled extensively with him; Robert Lockwood Jr., who knew him as his mother's partner; David "Honeyboy" Edwards, whose cousin Willie Mae Powell had a relationship with Johnson. From a mass of partial, conflicting, and inconsistent eyewitness accounts, biographers have attempted to summarize Johnson's character. "He was well mannered, he was soft spoken, he was indecipherable". "As for his character, everyone seems to agree that, while he was pleasant and outgoing in public, in private he was reserved and liked to go his own way". "Musicians who knew Johnson testified that he was a nice guy and fairly average—except, of course, for his musical talent, his weakness for whiskey and women, and his commitment to the road."

When Johnson arrived in a new town, he would play for tips on street corners or in front of the local barbershop or a restaurant. Musical associates have said that in live performances Johnson often did not focus on his dark and complex original compositions, but instead pleased audiences by performing more well-known pop standards of the dayand not necessarily blues. With an ability to pick up tunes at first hearing, he had no trouble giving his audiences what they wanted, and certain of his contemporaries later remarked on his interest in jazz and country music. He also had an uncanny ability to establish a rapport with his audience; in every town in which he stopped, he would establish ties to the local community that would serve him well when he passed through again a month or a year later.

Shines was 20 when he met Johnson in 1936. He estimated Johnson was maybe a year older than himself (Johnson was actually four years older). Shines is quoted describing Johnson in Samuel Charters's Robert Johnson:

During this time Johnson established what would be a relatively long-term relationship with Estella Coleman, a woman about 15 years his senior and the mother of the blues musician Robert Lockwood Jr.  Johnson reportedly cultivated a woman to look after him in each town he played in. He reputedly asked homely young women living in the country with their families whether he could go home with them, and in most cases, he was accepted, until a boyfriend arrived or Johnson was ready to move on.

In 1941, Alan Lomax learned from Muddy Waters that Johnson had performed in the area around Clarksdale, Mississippi. By 1959, the historian Samuel Charters could add only that Will Shade, of the Memphis Jug Band, remembered Johnson had once briefly played with him in West Memphis, Arkansas. In the last year of his life, Johnson is believed to have traveled to St. Louis, Chicago, Detroit, and New York City. In 1938, Columbia Records producer John H. Hammond, who owned some of Johnson's records, directed record producer Don Law to seek out Johnson to book him for the first "From Spirituals to Swing" concert at Carnegie Hall in New York. On learning of Johnson's death, Hammond replaced him with Big Bill Broonzy, but he played two of Johnson's records from the stage.

Recording sessions

In Jackson, Mississippi, around 1936, Johnson sought out H. C. Speir, who ran a general store and also acted as a talent scout. Speir put Johnson in touch with Ernie Oertle, who, as a salesman for the ARC group of labels, introduced Johnson to Don Law to record his first sessions in San Antonio, Texas. The recording session was held on November 23–25, 1936, in room 414 of the Gunter Hotel in San Antonio. In the ensuing three-day session, Johnson played 16 selections and recorded alternate takes for most of them. Among the songs Johnson recorded in San Antonio were "I Believe I'll Dust My Broom", "Sweet Home Chicago", and "Cross Road Blues", which later became blues standards. The first to be released was "Terraplane Blues", backed with "Last Fair Deal Gone Down", which sold as many as 10,000 copies.

Johnson traveled to Dallas, Texas, for another recording session with Don Law in a makeshift studio at the Vitagraph (Warner Bros.) Building, on June 19–20, 1937. Johnson recorded almost half of the 29 songs that make up his entire discography in Dallas and eleven records from this session were released within the following year. Most of Johnson's "somber and introspective" songs and performances come from his second recording session. Johnson did two takes of most of these songs, and recordings of those takes survived. Because of this, there is more opportunity to compare different performances of a single song by Johnson than for any other blues performer of his era. In contrast to most Delta players, Johnson had absorbed the idea of fitting a composed song into the three minutes of a 78-rpm side.

Death
Johnson died on August 16, 1938, at the age of 27, near Greenwood, Mississippi, of unknown causes. Johnson's death was not reported publicly. Almost 30 years later, Gayle Dean Wardlow, a Mississippi-based musicologist researching Johnson's life, found Johnson's death certificate, which listed only the date and location, with no official cause of death. No formal autopsy had been done. Instead, a pro forma examination was done to file the death certificate, and no immediate cause of death was determined. It is likely he had congenital syphilis and it was suspected later by medical professionals that this may have been a contributing factor in his death. However, 30 years of local oral tradition had, like the rest of his life story, built a legend which has filled in gaps in the scant historical record.

Several differing accounts have described the events preceding his death. According to one theory, Johnson was murdered by the jealous husband of a woman with whom he had flirted. In an account by the blues musician Sonny Boy Williamson, Johnson had been flirting with a married woman at a dance, and she gave him a bottle of whiskey poisoned by her husband. When Johnson took the bottle, Williamson knocked it out of his hand, admonishing him to never drink from a bottle that he had not personally seen opened. Johnson replied, "Don't ever knock a bottle out of my hand." Soon after, he was offered another (poisoned) bottle and accepted it. Johnson is reported to have begun feeling ill the evening after and had to be helped back to his room in the early morning hours. Over the next three days his condition steadily worsened. Witnesses reported that he died in a convulsive state of severe pain. The musicologist Robert "Mack" McCormick claimed to have tracked down the man who murdered Johnson and to have obtained a confession from him in a personal interview, but he declined to reveal the man's name.

While strychnine has been suggested as the poison that killed Johnson, at least one scholar has disputed the notion. Tom Graves, in his book Crossroads: The Life and Afterlife of Blues Legend Robert Johnson, relies on expert testimony from toxicologists to argue that strychnine has such a distinctive odor and taste that it cannot be disguised, even in strong liquor. Graves also claims that a significant amount of strychnine would have to be consumed in one sitting to be fatal, and that death from the poison would occur within hours, not days.

In their 2019 book Up Jumped the Devil, Bruce Conforth and Gayle Dean Wardlow suggest that the poison was naphthalene, from dissolved mothballs.  This was "a common way of poisoning people in the rural South", but was rarely fatal. However, Johnson had been diagnosed with an ulcer and with esophageal varices, and the poison was sufficient to cause them to hemorrhage. He died after two days of severe abdominal pain, vomiting, and bleeding from the mouth.

The LeFlore County registrar, Cornelia Jordan, years later and after conducting an investigation into Johnson's death for the state director of vital statistics, R. N. Whitfield, wrote a clarifying note on the back of Johnson's death certificate:

In 2006, a medical practitioner, David Connell, suggested, on the basis of photographs showing Johnson's "unnaturally long fingers" and "one bad eye", that Johnson may have had Marfan syndrome, which could have both affected his guitar playing and contributed to his death due to aortic dissection.

Gravesite

The exact location of Johnson's grave is officially unknown; three different markers have been erected at possible sites in church cemeteries outside Greenwood.
Research in the 1980s and 1990s strongly suggests Johnson was buried in the graveyard of the Mount Zion Missionary Baptist Church near Morgan City, Mississippi, not far from Greenwood, in an unmarked grave. A one-ton cenotaph in the shape of an obelisk, listing all of Johnson's song titles, with a central inscription by Peter Guralnick, was placed at this location in 1990, paid for by Columbia Records and numerous smaller contributions made through the Mt. Zion Memorial Fund.
 In 1990, a small marker with the epitaph "Resting in the Blues" was placed in the cemetery of Payne Chapel, near Quito, Mississippi, by an Atlanta rock group named the Tombstones, after they saw a photograph in Living Blues magazine of an unmarked spot alleged by one of Johnson's ex-girlfriends to be Johnson's burial site.
 More recent research by Stephen LaVere (including statements from Rosie Eskridge, the wife of the supposed gravedigger, in 2000) indicates that the actual grave site is under a big pecan tree in the cemetery of the Little Zion Church, north of Greenwood along Money Road. Through LaVere, Sony Music placed a marker at this site, which bears LaVere's name as well as Johnson's.   Researchers Bruce Conforth and Gayle Dean Wardlow also concluded this was Johnson's resting place in their 2019 biography.

John Hammond Jr., in the documentary The Search for Robert Johnson (1991), suggests that owing to poverty and lack of transportation Johnson is most likely to have been buried in a pauper's grave (or "potter's field") very near where he died.

Devil legend
According to legend, as a young man living on a plantation in rural Mississippi, Johnson had a tremendous desire to become a great blues musician. One of the legends often told says that Johnson was instructed to take his guitar to a crossroad near Dockery Plantation at midnight. (There are claims for other sites as the location of the crossroads.) There he was met by a large black man (the Devil) who took the guitar and tuned it. The Devil played a few songs and then returned the guitar to Johnson, giving him mastery of the instrument. This story of a deal with the Devil at the crossroads mirrors the legend of Faust. In exchange for his soul, Johnson was able to create the blues for which he became famous.

Various accounts
This legend was developed over time and has been chronicled by Gayle Dean Wardlow, Edward Komara and Elijah Wald, who sees the legend as largely dating from Johnson's rediscovery by white fans more than two decades after his death. Son House once told the story to Pete Welding as an explanation of Johnson's astonishingly rapid mastery of the guitar. Other interviewers failed to elicit any confirmation from House and there were fully two years between House's observation of Johnson as first a novice and then a master.

Further details were absorbed from the imaginative retellings by Greil Marcus and Robert Palmer. Most significantly, the detail was added that Johnson received his gift from a large black man at a crossroads. There is dispute as to how and when the crossroads detail was attached to the Robert Johnson story. All the published evidence, including a full chapter on the subject in the biography Crossroads, by Tom Graves, suggests an origin in the story of the blues musician Tommy Johnson. This story was collected from his musical associate Ishman Bracey and his elder brother Ledell in the 1960s. One version of Ledell Johnson's account was published in David Evans's 1971 biography of Tommy Johnson, and was repeated in print in 1982 alongside House's story in the widely read Searching for Robert Johnson, by Peter Guralnick.

In another version, Ledell placed the meeting not at a crossroads but in a graveyard. This resembles the story told to Steve LaVere that Ike Zimmerman of Hazlehurst, Mississippi, learned to play the guitar at midnight while sitting on tombstones. Zimmerman is believed to have influenced the playing of the young Johnson.  Recent research by the blues scholar Bruce Conforth, in Living Blues magazine, makes the story clearer. Johnson and Ike Zimmerman did practice in a graveyard at night, because it was quiet and no one would disturb them, but it was not the Hazlehurst cemetery as had been believed: Zimmerman was not from Hazlehurst but nearby Beauregard, and he did not practice in one graveyard, but in several in the area. Johnson spent about a year living with and learning from Zimmerman, who ultimately accompanied Johnson back to the Delta to look after him.

While Dockery, Hazlehurst and Beauregard have each been claimed as the locations of the mythical crossroads, there are also tourist attractions claiming to be "The Crossroads" in both Clarksdale and Memphis. Residents of Rosedale, Mississippi, claim Johnson sold his soul to the devil at the intersection of Highways 1 and 8 in their town, while the 1986 movie Crossroads was filmed in Beulah, Mississippi. The blues historian Steve Cheseborough wrote that it may be impossible to discover the exact location of the mythical crossroads, because "Robert Johnson was a rambling guy".

Interpretations
Some scholars have argued that the devil in these songs may refer not only to the Christian figure of Satan but also to the trickster god of African origin, Legba, himself associated with crossroads. Folklorist Harry M. Hyatt wrote that, during his research in the South from 1935 to 1939, when African-Americans born in the 19th or early 20th century said they or anyone else had "sold their soul to the devil at the crossroads", they had a different meaning in mind. Hyatt claimed there was evidence indicating African religious retentions surrounding Legba and the making of a "deal" (not selling the soul in the same sense as in the Faustian tradition cited by Graves) with the so-called devil at the crossroads.

This view that the devil in Johnson's songs is derived from an African deity was disputed by the blues scholar David Evans in an essay published in 1999, "Demythologizing the Blues":

The musicologist Alan Lomax dismissed the myth, stating, "In fact, every blues fiddler, banjo picker, harp blower, piano strummer and guitar framer was, in the opinion of both himself and his peers, a child of the Devil, a consequence of the black view of the European dance embrace as sinful in the extreme".

Both Lomax's and Evans's accounts themselves have been disputed and dismissed by Black scholars and authors including Amiri Baraka and Cornel West. West defines Blues as a creation of a people "who are willing to look unflinchingly at catastrophic conditions", as children of God responding to those conditions. Baraka's words are more directly critical of white writers who study African-American Blues artform and culture from a Western viewpoint, stating that they "They have to do that to make themselves superior in some kind of way: that everything has come from Europe, which is not true". Baraka cites that rather than being formed out of any Western context, Blues derives from an African context of its own. The call-and-response singing Lomax argues is different than Blues has been widely cited as being a central aspect of Blues music.

Musical style
Johnson is considered a master of the blues, particularly of the Delta blues style. Keith Richards, of the Rolling Stones, said in 1990, "You want to know how good the blues can get? Well, this is it". But according to Elijah Wald, in his book Escaping the Delta, Johnson in his own time was most respected for his ability to play in a wide range of styles, from raw country slide guitar to jazz and pop licks, and for his ability to pick up guitar parts almost instantly upon hearing a song. His first recorded song, "Kind Hearted Woman Blues", in contrast to the prevailing Delta style of the time, more resembled the style of Chicago or St. Louis, with "a full-fledged, abundantly varied musical arrangement". The song was part of a cycle of spin-offs and response songs that began with Leroy Carr's "Mean Mistreater Mama" (1934). According to Wald, it was "the most musically complex in the cycle" and stood apart from most rural blues as a thoroughly composed lyric, rather than an arbitrary collection of more or less unrelated verses.  Unusual for a Delta player of the time, a recording exhibits what Johnson could do entirely outside of a blues style. "They're Red Hot", from his first recording session, shows that he was also comfortable with an "uptown" swing or ragtime sound similar to that of the Harlem Hamfats, but as Wald remarked, "no record company was heading to Mississippi in search of a down-home Ink Spots... [H]e could undoubtedly have come up with a lot more songs in this style if the producers had wanted them."

Voice
An important aspect of Johnson's singing was his use of microtonality. These subtle inflections of pitch help explain why his singing conveys such powerful emotion. Eric Clapton described Johnson's music as "the most powerful cry that I think you can find in the human voice". In two takes of "Me and the Devil Blues" he shows a high degree of precision in the complex vocal delivery of the last verse: "The range of tone he can pack into a few lines is astonishing." The song's "hip humor and sophistication" is often overlooked. "[G]enerations of blues writers in search of wild Delta primitivism", wrote Wald, have been inclined to overlook or undervalue aspects that show Johnson as a polished professional performer.

Johnson is also known for using the guitar as "the other vocalist in the song", a technique later perfected by B.B. King and his personified guitar named Lucille: "In Africa and in Afro-American tradition, there is the tradition of the talking instrument, beginning with the drums... the one-strand and then the six-strings with bottleneck-style performance; it becomes a competing voice... or a complementary voice... in the performance."

Instrument

Johnson mastered the guitar, being considered today one of the all-time greats on the instrument. His approach was complex and musically advanced. When Keith Richards was first introduced to Johnson's music by his bandmate Brian Jones, he asked, "Who is the other guy playing with him?", not realizing it was Johnson playing one guitar. "I was hearing two guitars, and it took a long time to actually realise he was doing it all by himself", said Richards, who later stated that "Robert Johnson was like an orchestra all by himself". "As for his guitar technique, it's politely reedy but ambitiously eclectic—moving effortlessly from hen-picking and bottleneck slides to a full deck of chucka-chucka rhythm figures."

Lyrics
In The Story with Dick Gordon, Bill Ferris, of American Public Media, said, "Robert Johnson I think of in the same way I think of the British Romantic poets, Keats and Shelley, who burned out early, who were geniuses at wordsmithing poetry... The Blues, if anything, are deeply sexual. You know, 'my car doesn't run, I'm gonna check my oil... 'if you don't like my apples, don't shake my tree'. Every verse has sexuality associated with it."

Influences
Johnson fused approaches specific to Delta blues to those from the broader music world. The slide guitar work on "Ramblin' on My Mind" is pure Delta and Johnson's vocal there has "a touch of... Son House rawness", but the train imitation on the bridge is not at all typical of Delta blues—it is more like something out of minstrel show music or vaudeville. Johnson did record versions of "Preaching the Blues" and "Walking Blues" in the older bluesman's vocal and guitar style (House's chronology has been questioned by Guralnick). As with the first take of "Come On in My Kitchen", the influence of Skip James is evident in James's "Devil Got My Woman", but the lyrics rise to the level of first-rate poetry, and Johnson sings with a strained voice found nowhere else in his recorded output.

The sad, romantic "Love in Vain" successfully blends several of Johnson's disparate influences. The form, including the wordless last verse, follows Leroy Carr's last hit "When the Sun Goes Down"; the words of the last sung verse come directly from a song Blind Lemon Jefferson recorded in 1926.  Johnson's last recording, "Milkcow's Calf Blues" is his most direct tribute to Kokomo Arnold, who wrote "Milkcow Blues" and influenced Johnson's vocal style.

"From Four Until Late" shows Johnson's mastery of a blues style not usually associated with the Delta. He croons the lyrics in a manner reminiscent of Lonnie Johnson, and his guitar style is more that of a ragtime-influenced player like Blind Blake. Lonnie Johnson's influence is even clearer in two other departures from the usual Delta style: "Malted Milk" and "Drunken Hearted Man". Both copy the arrangement of Lonnie Johnson's "Life Saver Blues".  The two takes of "Me and the Devil Blues" show the influence of Peetie Wheatstraw, calling into question the interpretation of this piece as "the spontaneous heart-cry of a demon-driven folk artist".

Legacy

Early recognition and reviews
Famed producer John Hammond was an early advocate of Johnson's music.  Using the pen-name Henry Johnson, he wrote his first article on Robert Johnson for the New Masses magazine in March 1937, around the time of the release of Johnson's first record.  In it, he described Johnson as "the greatest Negro blues singer who has cropped up in recent years... Johnson makes Leadbelly sound like an accomplished poseur."  The following year, Hammond hoped to get Johnson to perform at a December 1938 From Spirituals to Swing concert in New York City, as he was unaware that Johnson had died in August. Instead, Hammond played two of his recordings, "Walkin' Blues" and "Preachin' Blues (Up Jumped the Devil)", for the audience and "praised Johnson lavishly from the stage". Music historian Ted Gioia noted "Here, if only through the medium of recordings, Hammond used his considerable influence at this historic event to advocate a position of preeminence for the late Delta bluesman". Music educator James Perone also saw that the event "underscored Robert Johnson's specific importance as a recording artist".  In 1939, Columbia issued a final single, pairing "Preachin' Blues" with "Love in Vain".

In 1942, commentary on Johnson's "Terraplane Blues" and "Last Fair Deal Gone Down" was included in The Jazz Record Book, edited by Charles Edward Smith. The authors described Johnson's vocals as "imaginative" and "thrilling" and his guitar playing as "exciting as almost anything in the folk blues field".   Music writer Rudi Blesh included a review of Johnson's "Hellhound on My Trail" in his 1946 book Shining Trumpets: a History of Jazz. He noted the "personal and creative way" Johnson approached the song's harmony. Jim Wilson, then a writer for the Detroit Free Press, also mentioned his unconventional use of harmony.  In a 1949 review, he compared elements of John Lee Hooker's recent debut "Boogie Chillen": "His [Hooker's] dynamic rhythms and subtle nuances on the guitar and his startling disregard for familiar scale and harmony patterns show similarity to the work of Robert Johnson, who made many fine records in this vein."

Samuel Charters drew further attention to Johnson in a five-page section in his 1959 book, The Country Blues.  He focused on the two Johnson recordings that referred to images of the devil or hell"Hellhound on My Trail" and "Me and the Devil Blues"to suggest that Johnson was a deeply troubled individual.  Charters also included Johnson's "Preachin' Blues" on the album published alongside his book. Columbia Records' first album of Johnson's recordings, King of the Delta Blues Singers, was issued two years later.

Musicianship
Johnson is mentioned as one of the Delta artists who was a strong influence on blues singers in post-war styles. However, it is Johnson's guitar technique that is often identified as his greatest contribution. Blues historian Edward Komara wrote:

This technique has been called a "boogie bass pattern" or "boogie shuffle" and is described as a "fifth–sixth [degrees of a major scale] oscillation above the root chord". Sometimes, it has been attributed to Johnnie Temple, because he was the first to record a song in 1935 using it.  However, Temple confirmed that he had learned the technique from Johnson: "He was the first one I ever heard use it... It was similar to a piano boogie bass [which] I learned from R. L. [Johnson] in '32 or '33." Johnny Shines added: "Some of the things that Robert did with the guitar affected the way everybody played. In the early thirties, boogie was rare on the guitar, something to be heard." Conforth and Wardlow call it "one of the most important riffs in blues music" and music historian Peter Guralnick believes Johnson "popularized a mode [walking bass style on guitar] which would rapidly become the accepted pattern". Although author Elijah Wald recognizes Johnson's contribution in popularizing the innovation, he discounts its importance and adds, "As far as the evolution of black music goes, Robert Johnson was an extremely minor figure, and very little that happened in the decades following his death would have been affected if he had never played a note".

Contemporaries
Johnson's contemporaries, including Johnny Shines, Johnnie Temple, Henry Townsend, Robert Lockwood Jr., Calvin Frazier, and David "Honeyboy" Edwards were among those who kept his music alive through performing his songs and using his guitar techniques. Fellow Mississippi native Elmore James is the best known and is responsible for popularizing Johnson's "Dust My Broom". In 1951, he recast the song as a Chicago-style blues, with electric slide guitar and a backing band. According to blues historian Gerard Herhaft:

James' version is identified as "one of the first recorded examples of what was to become the classic Chicago shuffle beat". The style often associated with Chicago blues was used extensively by Jimmy Reed beginning with his first record "High and Lonesome" in 1953. Sometimes called "the trademark Reed shuffle" (although also associated his second guitarist, Eddie Taylor), it is the figure Johnson used updated for electric guitar.

Blues standards
Several of Johnson's songs became blues standards, which is used to describe blues songs that have been widely performed and recorded over a period of time and are seen as having a lasting quality. Perone notes "That such a relatively high percentage of the songs attributed to him became blues standards also keeps the legacy of Robert Johnson alive." Those most often identified are "Sweet Home Chicago" and "Dust My Broom", but also include "Crossroads" and "Stop Breaking Down". As with many blues songs, there are melodic and lyrical precedents. While "Sweet Home Chicago" borrows from Kokomo Arnold's 1933 "Old Original Kokomo Blues", "Johnson's lyrics made the song a natural for Chicago bluesmen, and it's his version that survived in the repertoires of performers like Magic Sam, Robert Lockwood, and Junior Parker".

In the first decades after Johnsons' death, these songs, with some variations in the titles and lyrics, were recorded by Tommy McClennan (1939), Walter Davis (1941), Sonny Boy Williamson I (1945), Arthur Crudup (1949), Elmore James (1951–1959), Baby Boy Warren (1954), Roosevelt Sykes (1955), Junior Parker (1958), and Forest City Joe (1959). Pearson and McCulloch believe that "Sweet Home Chicago" and "Dust My Broom" in particular connect Johnson to "the rightful inheritors of his musical ideas—big-city African American artists whose high-powered, electrically amplified blues remain solidly in touch with Johnson's musical legacy" at the time of Columbia's first release of a full album of his songs in 1961.

In Jim O'Neal's statement when Johnson was inducted into the Blues Foundation Blues Hall of Fame, he identified "Hell Hound on My Trail", "Sweet Home Chicago", "Dust My Broom", "Love in Vain", and "Crossroads" as Johnson's classic recordings. Over the years, these songs have been individually inducted into the Blues Hall's "Classic of Blues RecordingSingle or Album Track" category.

Rock music
In the mid-1950s, rock and roll pioneer Chuck Berry adapted the boogie pattern on guitar for his songs "Roll Over Beethoven" and "Johnny B. Goode". Author Dave Rubin commented:

The pattern "became one of the signature figures in early electric guitar-based rock and roll, such as that of Chuck Berry and the numerous rock musicians of the 1960s who were influenced by Berry", according to Perone. Although music historian Larry Birnbaum also sees the connection, he wrote that Johnson's "contributions to the origins of rock 'n' roll are negligible". The Rock and Roll Hall of Fame inducted Johnson as an early influence in its first induction ceremony, in 1986, almost a half century after his death. It also included four of his songs it deemed to have shaped the genre: "Sweet Home Chicago", "Cross Road Blues", "Hellhound on My Trail", and "Love in Vain".  Marc Meyers, of the Wall Street Journal, commented, "His 'Stop Breakin' Down Blues' from 1937 is so far ahead of its time that the song could easily have been a rock demo cut in 1954."

Several rock artists describe Johnson as an influence:
 Eric Clapton"Robert Johnson to me is the most important blues musician who ever lived". He recorded several of Johnson's songs as well as an entire tribute album, Me and Mr. Johnson (2004). Clapton feels that rather than trying to recreate Johnson's originals, "I was trying to extract as much emotional content from it as I could, while respecting the form at the same time."
 Bob Dylan"In about 1964 and '65, I probably used about five or six of Robert Johnson's blues song forms, too, unconsciously, but more on the lyrical imagery side of things. If I hadn't heard the Robert Johnson record when I did, there probably would have been hundreds of lines of mine that would have been shut down—that I wouldn't have felt free enough or upraised enough to write. [His] code of language was like nothing I'd heard before or since."
 Robert Plant"A lot of English musicians were very fired up by Robert Johnson [to] whom we all owe more or less our existence, I guess, in some way". Led Zeppelin recorded "Traveling Riverside Blues" and quoted some of Johnson's lyrics in "The Lemon Song".
Keith Richards"I've never heard anybody before or since use the [blues] form and bend it so much to make it work for himself... he came out with such compelling themes [and] just the way they were treated, apart from the music and the performance, [was appealing]." The Rolling Stones recorded "Love in Vain" and "Stop Breaking Down".
Johnny Winter"Robert Johnson knocked me out—he was a genius. [He and Son House] both were big influences on my acoustic slide playing." He recorded "Dust My Broom" with additional guitar by Derek Trucks.

Problems of biography

Until the 2019 publication of Bruce Conforth and Gayle Dean Wardlow's biography, Up Jumped the Devil: The Real Life of Robert Johnson, little of Johnson's early life was known. Two marriage licenses for Johnson have been located in county records offices. The ages given in these certificates point to different birth dates, but Conforth and Wardlow suggest that Johnson lied about his age in order to obtain a marriage license. Carrie Thompson claimed that her mother, who was also Robert's mother, remembered his birth date as May8, 1911. He was not listed among his mother's children in the 1910 census giving further credence to a 1911 birthdate.  Although the 1920 census gives his age as 7, suggesting he was born in 1912 or 1913, the entry showing his attendance at Indian Creek School, in Tunica, Mississippi listed him as being 14 years old.

Five significant dates from his career are documented: Monday, Thursday and Friday, November 23, 26, and 27, 1936, at a recording session in San Antonio, Texas; and Saturday and Sunday, June 19 and 20, 1937, at a recording session in Dallas. His death certificate, discovered in 1968, lists the date and location of his death.

Johnson's records were admired by record collectors from the time of their first release, and efforts were made to discover his biography, with virtually no success. A relatively full account of Johnson's brief musical career emerged in the 1960s, largely from accounts by Son House, Johnny Shines, David Honeyboy Edwards and Robert Lockwood. In 1961, the sleeve notes to the album King of the Delta Blues Singers included reminiscences of Don Law who had recorded Johnson in 1936. Law added to the mystique surrounding Johnson, representing him as very young and extraordinarily shy.

The blues researcher Mack McCormick began researching his family background in 1972, but died in 2015 without ever publishing his findings. McCormick's research eventually became as much a legend as Johnson himself. In 1982, McCormick permitted Peter Guralnick to publish a summary in Living Blues (1982), later reprinted in book form as Searching for Robert Johnson. Later research has sought to confirm this account or to add minor details. A revised summary acknowledging major informants was written by Stephen LaVere for the booklet accompanying Robert Johnson, The Complete Recordings box set (1990). The documentary film The Search for Robert Johnson contains accounts by McCormick and Wardlow of what informants have told them: long interviews of David "Honeyboy" Edwards and Johnny Shines and short interviews of surviving friends and family. Another film, Can't You Hear the Wind Howl?: The Life & Music of Robert Johnson, combines documentary segments with recreated scenes featuring Keb' Mo' as Johnson with narration by Danny Glover. Shines, Edwards and Robert Lockwood contribute interviews. These published biographical sketches achieve coherent narratives, partly by ignoring reminiscences and hearsay accounts which contradict or conflict with other accounts.

Photographs
Until the 1980s, it was believed that no images of Johnson had survived. However, three images of Johnson were located in 1972 and 1973, in the possession of his half-sister Carrie Thompson. Two of these, known as the "dime-store photo" (December 1937 or January 1938) and the "studio portrait" (summer 1936), were copyrighted by Stephen LaVere (who had obtained them from the Thompson family) in 1986 and 1989, respectively, with an agreement to share any ensuing royalties 50% with the Johnson estate, at that time administered by Thompson. The "dime-store photo" was first published, almost in passing, in an issue of Rolling Stone magazine in 1986, and the studio portrait in a 1989 article by Stephen Calt and Gayle Dean Wardlow in 78 Quarterly.  Both were subsequently featured prominently in the printed materials associated with the 1990 CBS box set of the "complete" Johnson recordings, as well as being widely republished since that time. Because Mississippi courts in 1998 determined that Robert Johnson's heir was Claud Johnson, a son born out of wedlock, the "estate share" of all monies paid to LaVere by CBS and others ended up going to Claud Johnson, and attempts by the heirs of Carrie Thompson to obtain a ruling that the photographs were her personal property and not part of the estate were dismissed. In his book Searching for Robert Johnson, Peter Guralnick stated that the blues archivist Mack McCormick showed him a photograph of Johnson with his nephew Louis, taken at the same time as the famous "pinstripe suit" photograph, showing Louis dressed in his United States Navy uniform; this picture, along with the "studio portrait", were both lent by Carrie Thompson to McCormick in 1972. This photograph has never been made public.

Another photograph, purporting to show Johnson posing with the blues musician Johnny Shines, was published in the November 2008 issue of Vanity Fair magazine. Its authenticity was claimed by the forensic artist Lois Gibson and by Johnson's estate in 2013, but has been disputed by some music historians, including Elijah Wald, Bruce Conforth and Gayle Dean Wardlow, who considered that the clothing suggests a date after Johnson's death and that the photograph may have been reversed and retouched.  Further, both David "Honeyboy" Edwards and Robert Lockwood failed to identify either man in the photo.  Facial recognition software concluded that neither man was Johnson or Shines. Finally, Gibson claimed the photo was from 1933 to 1934 while it is now known that Johnson did not meet Shines until early 1937. In December 2015, a fourth photograph was published, purportedly showing Johnson, his wife Calletta Craft, Estella Coleman, and Robert Lockwood Jr. This photograph was also declared authentic by Lois Gibson, but her identification of Johnson has been dismissed by other facial recognition experts and blues historians.  There are a number of reasons why the photograph is unlikely to be Johnson: it has been proven that Craft died before Johnson met Coleman, the clothing could not be prior to the late 1940s, the furniture is from the 1950s, the Coca-Cola bottle cannot be from prior to 1950, etc.

A third photograph of Johnson, this time smiling, was published in 2020.  It is believed to have been taken in Memphis on the same occasion as the verified photograph of him with a guitar and cigarette (part of the "dime-store" set), and is in the possession of Annye Anderson, Johnson's step-sister (Anderson is the daughter of Charles Dodds, later Spencer, who was married to Robert's mother but was not his father).  As a child, Anderson grew up in the same family as Johnson and has claimed to have been present, aged 10 or 11, on the occasion the photograph was taken. This photograph was published in Vanity Fair in May 2020, as the cover image for a book, Brother Robert: Growing Up with Robert Johnson, written by Anderson in collaboration with author Preston Lauterbach, and is considered to be authentic by Johnson scholar Elijah Wald.

Descendants
Johnson left no will. In 1998, the Mississippi Supreme Court ruled that Claud Johnson, a retired truck driver living in Crystal Springs, Mississippi, was the son of Robert Johnson and his only heir. The court heard that he had been born to Virgie Jane Smith (later Virgie Jane Cain), who had a relationship with Robert Johnson in 1931. The relationship was attested to by a friend, Eula Mae Williams, but other relatives descended from Robert Johnson's half-sister, Carrie Harris Thompson, contested Claud Johnson's claim. The effect of the judgment was to allow Claud Johnson to receive over $1 million in royalties. Claud Johnson died, aged 83, on June 30, 2015, leaving six children.

Discography

Eleven 78-rpm records by Johnson were released by Vocalion Records in 1937 and 1938, with additional pressings by ARC budget labels. In 1939, a twelfth was issued posthumously. Johnson's estate holds the copyrights to his songs. In 1961, Columbia Records released King of the Delta Blues Singers, an album representing the first modern-era release of Johnson's performances, which started the "re-discovery" of Johnson as blues artist. In 1970, Columbia issued a second volume, King of the Delta Blues Singers, Vol. II.

The Complete Recordings, a two-disc set, released on August 28, 1990, contains almost everything Johnson recorded, with all 29 recordings, and 12 alternate takes. Another alternate take of "Traveling Riverside Blues" was released by Sony on the CD reissue of King of the Delta Blues Singers. To celebrate the 100th anniversary of Johnson's birth, May 8, 2011, Sony Legacy released Robert Johnson: The Centennial Collection, a re-mastered 2-CD set of all 42 of his recordings and two brief fragments, one of Johnson practicing a guitar figure and the other of Johnson saying, presumably to engineer Don Law, "I wanna go on with our next one myself." Reviewers commented that the sound quality of the 2011 release was a substantial improvement on the 1990 release.

Awards and recognition
1980Blues Hall of Fame: performer
1986Rock and Roll Hall of Fame: early influence
1990Spin magazine: first in its list of "35 Guitar Gods" on the 52nd anniversary of his death
1991Grammy Award: best historical album (The Complete Recordings)
1991Blues Music Award: reissue album (The Complete Recordings)
1994U.S. Postal Service: commemorative stamp
1995Rock and Roll Hall of Fame "500 Songs That Shaped Rock and Roll": "Sweet Home Chicago", "Cross Road Blues", "Hellhound on My Trail", "Love in Vain"
1998Grammy Hall of Fame: "Cross Road Blues"
2000Mississippi Musicians Hall of Fame: Blues pioneer
2003National Recording Registry: The Complete Recordings
2003Rolling Stones David Fricke: fifth on his list of "100 Greatest Guitarists of All Time"
2006Grammy Lifetime Achievement Award: performer
2008Marker  on the Mississippi Blues Trail at his birthplace in Hazlehurst; also, at his presumed gravesite in Greenwood
2010Gibson.com: ninth on its list of "Top 50 Guitarists of All Time"
2014Grammy Hall of Fame: "Sweet Home Chicago

In popular culture
The season 2 episode 6 of the NBC sci-fi time-travel series Timeless, "King of The Delta Blues", is about the heroes travelling back to San Antonio in 1936 when Robert Johnson and Don Law were recording Johnson's first album in a hotel room. The show features quite a bit of Johnson's singing and playing. 

Me and the Devil Blues is a Japanese manga series taking its name from the song of the same name by Robert Johnson. Written and illustrated by Akira Hiramoto, it chronicles a fictional version of Robert Johnson's life. Called "RJ" by friend and foe alike, the musician sells his soul to the devil for the talent to play the Blues. The price of the deal costs him his family and his former life, while granting him a ten-fingered right hand that can play Blues peerlessly. The talent brings him nothing but trouble, and the unwanted companionship of the infamous Clyde Barrow. Me and the Devil Blues won the 2009 Glyph Comics Awards in the Best Reprint Publication category.

References

Bibliography

External links

 . State of Mississippi.
 Bluesman's Son Gets His Due Ellen Barry, Los Angeles Times. June 2, 2004. Johnson Legal Battle.

Robert Johnson
1911 births
1938 deaths
People from Hazlehurst, Mississippi
African-American male singer-songwriters
African-American guitarists
Delta blues musicians
Country blues musicians
Country blues singers
Blues musicians from Mississippi
American blues guitarists
American male guitarists
American blues singer-songwriters
American street performers
Slide guitarists
Vocalion Records artists
Columbia Records artists
Juke Joint blues musicians
20th-century American guitarists
Singer-songwriters from Mississippi
Unsolved deaths in the United States
Guitarists from Mississippi
Mississippi Blues Trail
20th-century African-American male singers
Deal with the Devil